Sargocentron is a genus of squirrelfish (family Holocentridae) found in tropical parts of the Indian, Pacific and Atlantic Oceans, with the greatest species diversity near reefs in the Indo-Pacific. Being largely or entirely nocturnal, they have relatively large eyes. Red and silvery colours dominate. The preopercle spines (near the gill-opening) are venomous and can give painful wounds.

Species
There are currently 33 recognized species in this genus:
 Sargocentron borodinoensis Kotlyar, 2017
 Sargocentron bullisi (Woods, 1955) (Deep-water squirrelfish)
 Sargocentron caudimaculatum (Rüppell, 1838) (Silver-spot squirrelfish)
 Sargocentron cornutum (Bleeker, 1854) (Three-spot squirrelfish)
 Sargocentron coruscum (Poey, 1860) (Reef squirrelfish)
 Sargocentron diadema (Lacépède, 1802) (Crown squirrelfish)
 Sargocentron dorsomaculatum (Shimizu & Yamakawa, 1979) (Spot-fin squirrelfish)
 Sargocentron ensifer (D. S. Jordan & Evermann, 1903) (Yellow-striped squirrelfish)  
 Sargocentron hastatum (G. Cuvier, 1829) (Red squirrelfish)
 Sargocentron hormion J. E. Randall, 1998
 Sargocentron inaequalis J. E. Randall & Heemstra, 1985 (Lattice squirrelfish)
 Sargocentron iota J. E. Randall, 1998 (Dwarf squirrelfish)
 Sargocentron ittodai (D. S. Jordan & Fowler, 1902) (Samurai squirrelfish)
 Sargocentron lepros (G. R. Allen & N. J. Cross, 1983) (Spiny squirrelfish)
 Sargocentron macrosquamis Golani, 1984 (Big-scale squirrelfish)
 Sargocentron marisrubri J. E. Randall, Golani & Diamant, 1989
 Sargocentron megalops J. E. Randall, 1998
 Sargocentron melanospilos (Bleeker, 1858) (Black-blotch squirrelfish)
 Sargocentron microstoma (Günther, 1859) (Small-mouth squirrelfish)
 Sargocentron poco (Woods, 1965) (Saddle squirrelfish)
 Sargocentron praslin (Lacépède, 1802) (Dark-striped squirrelfish)
 Sargocentron punctatissimum (G. Cuvier, 1829) (Speckled squirrelfish)
 Sargocentron rubrum (Forsskål, 1775) (Red-coat squirrelfish)
 Sargocentron seychellense (J. L. B. Smith & M. M. Smith, 1963) (Yellow-tipped squirrelfish)
 Sargocentron shimizui J. E. Randall, 1998 (Shimizu's squirrelfish)
 Sargocentron spiniferum (Forsskål, 1775) (Sabre squirrelfish)
 Sargocentron spinosissimum (Temminck & Schlegel, 1843) (North Pacific squirrelfish)
 Sargocentron suborbitale (T. N. Gill, 1863) (Tinsel squirrelfish)
 Sargocentron tiere (G. Cuvier, 1829) (Blue-lined squirrelfish)
 Sargocentron tiereoides (Bleeker, 1853) (Pink squirrelfish)
 Sargocentron vexillarium (Poey, 1860) (Dusky squirrelfish)
 Sargocentron violaceum (Bleeker, 1853) (Violet squirrelfish)
 Sargocentron wilhelmi (F. de Buen, 1963) (Wilhelm's squirrelfish)
 Sargocentron xantherythrum (D. S. Jordan & Evermann, 1903) (Hawaiian squirrelfish)

References

 
Marine fish genera
Taxa named by Henry Weed Fowler